The 1988 Ballon d'Or, given to the best football player in Europe as judged by a panel of sports journalists from UEFA member countries, was awarded to Marco van Basten on 27 December 1988. There were 27 voters, from Albania, Austria, Belgium, Bulgaria, Czechoslovakia, Denmark, East Germany, England, Finland, France, Greece, Hungary, Italy, Luxembourg, the Netherlands, Poland, Portugal, Republic of Ireland, Romania, Scotland, Soviet Union, Spain, Sweden, Switzerland, Turkey, West Germany and Yugoslavia. Van Basten was the third Dutch national to win the award after Johan Cruyff (1971, 1973, 1974) and Ruud Gullit (1987).

Rankings

References

External links
 

1988
1988–89 in European football